Ricardo González (born 1946 in Cuba) is an American politician. He is a former member of the Madison, Wisconsin Common Council and the first openly gay Latino elected to public office in the United States. González is the Past President of the Cuban Committee for Democracy.

Advocacy and public office 
In 1974, González opened a bar called The Cardinal which became a gay-friendly venue of choice for fundraisers for both liberal politicians and various causes. At the time, González was an affirmative action officer with the State of Wisconsin appointed by then Governor of Wisconsin Patrick Lucey. Gonzales served on the board of "The United," a gay organization, and as a counselor at the now-defunct Gay Center in Madison. He has also been a long-time supporter of the Madison AIDS Support Network.

In 1989, González was elected to the Madison Common Council representing District 4.

Common Council (1989-2000) 
During his time on the council, González helped establish Madison's sister city relationship with the Cuban city of Camagüey. González played an instrumental role in the creation of the Monona Terrace Convention Center. Foremost on González's agenda as alderman was the revitalization of Downtown Madison.

Legacy 
González' papers are housed in the UW-Madison historic archives. In 2011, González was awarded with the Martin Luther King Jr. Legacy Award.

References 

1946 births
Living people
Gay politicians
American politicians of Cuban descent
20th-century American politicians
Wisconsin Democrats
American LGBT rights activists
Activists from Wisconsin
Hispanic and Latino American politicians
Wisconsin city council members
Politicians from Madison, Wisconsin
American LGBT city council members
Cuban LGBT politicians
Cuban gay men
LGBT people from Wisconsin
LGBT Hispanic and Latino American people